James Allison or Jim Allison may refer to:

 James Allison (pirate) (fl. 1689–1691), pirate active near Cape Verde and the Bay of Campeche
 James Allison Jr. (1772–1854), member of the U.S. House of Representatives from Pennsylvania
 James Whidden Allison (1795–1867), Nova Scotia politician
 James Allison (theatre) (1831–1890), Australian theatre manager
 James Allison (Wisconsin politician) (1858–?), Wisconsin politician
 James Edward Allison (1870–1955), American architect with Allison & Allison
 James A. Allison (1872–1928), American inventor and businessman
 Barney Allison (James Barnett Allison, 1880–1907), Irish rugby union player
 Jim Allison (American football) (born 1943), American football player
 James P. Allison (born 1948), American immunologist and Nobel laureate
 James Allison (motorsport) (born 1968), English engineer

Characters 
 James Allison (Robert E. Howard), a character created by Robert E. Howard

See also
 James Alison (born 1959), Catholic priest, theologian and author